Paul is a village in the civil parish of Penzance, Cornwall, United Kingdom.

Paul

References

Citations

Sources

 
 
 
 
 
 
 
 
 
 
 
 

Buildings and structures in Penzance
Lists of listed buildings in Cornwall